The Priorities and Planning Committee was a key organ of the Cabinet of Canada.  Usually chaired by the Prime Minister of Canada, this committee set and guided the agenda of the government and in some cases acts for the whole cabinet under Prime Minister Stephen Harper.

As of March 31, 2014, the members of the committee were Stephen Harper (chair), Joe Oliver (vice-chair), Bernard Valcourt, Rob Nicholson, Peter MacKay, Rona Ambrose, Diane Finley, John Baird, Tony Clement, Jason Kenney, Gerry Ritz, Christian Paradis, James Moore, Denis Lebel, Ed Fast, and Shelly Glover.

As of June 4, 2013, the members of the committee were Stephen Harper (chair), Senator Marjory LeBreton (vice-chair), Peter MacKay, Vic Toews, Diane Finley, John Baird, Tony Clement, Jim Flaherty, Jason Kenney, Christian Paradis, James Moore, Denis Lebel, and Ed Fast.

As of October 30, 2008, the members of the committee were Stephen Harper (chair), Lawrence Cannon (vice-chair), Marjory LeBreton, Chuck Strahl, Peter MacKay, Stockwell Day, Vic Toews, Jim Prentice, John Baird, Tony Clement, Jim Flaherty, Josée Verner, and Christian Paradis.

Most provinces and territories of Canada have a similar body within their cabinets.

In November 2015, the Priorities and Planning Committee ceased to exist with the announcement of the Cabinet committee structure under Justin Trudeau.

Government of Canada